This is a summary of 1957 in music in the United Kingdom, including the official charts from that year.

Events
1 January – Benjamin Britten conducts the opening performance of his ballet The Prince of the Pagodas at Covent Garden.
11 January – Tommy Steele reaches no 1 in the UK chart with his cover of "Singing the Blues", thus achieving chart-topping success before his American rival Elvis Presley.
16 January – The Cavern Club opens in Liverpool as a jazz club.
25 January – First performance of William Walton's Cello Concerto in Boston.
3 March – Patricia Bredin represents the UK at the 2nd Eurovision Song Contest in Frankfurt, finishing in 7th place.  It is the first time the UK has entered the competition.
June – Kay Kendall, star of Les Girls, marries Rex Harrison, star of My Fair Lady.
6 July – John Lennon and Paul McCartney of The Beatles first meet at a garden fete at St. Peter's Church, Woolton, Liverpool, at which Lennon's skiffle group, The Quarrymen, is playing (and in the graveyard of which an Eleanor Rigby is buried).
7 August – The Quarrymen first play at The Cavern Club in Liverpool in an interlude spot between jazz bands; when John Lennon starts the group playing Elvis Presley's "Don't Be Cruel", the club's owner at this time hands him a note reading "Cut out the bloody rock 'n roll".

Charts
See UK No.1 Hits of 1957

Classical music: new works
Malcolm Arnold – The River Kwai March, Toy Symphony
Arthur Bliss - Discourse for orchestra
Benjamin Britten – Songs from the Chinese Op. 58, for soprano or tenor and guitar
Gordon Jacob – Piano Concerto No. 2
Robin Orr - Rhapsody for string orchestra
Edmund Rubbra - Symphony No 7
Michael Tippett – Symphony No. 2
William Walton – Partita for Orchestra
Grace Williams - Symphony No 2

Opera
Benjamin Britten – Noye's Fludde (composition draft completed 18 December).

Film and Incidental music
Richard Addinsell – The Prince and the Showgirl directed by and starring Laurence Olivier, co-starring Marilyn Monroe.
John Addison – 
The Entertainer – opening 10 April at the Royal Court Theatre, London.
Lucky Jim directed by John Boulting, starring Ian Carmichael, Terry-Thomas and Hugh Griffith.
Malcolm Arnold – 
Blue Murder at St Trinian's, starring Terry-Thomas, George Cole, Joyce Grenfell, Lionel Jeffries and Richard Wattis.
The Bridge on the River Kwai directed by David Lean, starring William Holden, Jack Hawkins, Alec Guinness and Sessue Hayakawa.
James Bernard – 
Across the Bridge, starring Rod Steiger and Bernard Lee.
The Curse of Frankenstein directed by Terence Fisher, starring Peter Cushing and Christopher Lee.
Stanley Black – The Naked Truth, starring Terry-Thomas, Peter Sellers and Dennis Price.
Muir Mathieson – Campbell's Kingdom, starring Dirk Bogarde and Stanley Baker.
Clifton Parker – Night of the Demon directed by Jacques Tourneur, starring Dana Andrews, Peggy Cummins and Niall MacGinnis.
Humphrey Searle – 
The Abominable Snowman directed by Val Guest, starring Peter Cushing.
The Passionate Stranger, starring Margaret Leighton and Ralph Richardson.

Musical theatre
11 April – Zuleika, with music by Peter Tranchell and book and lyrics by James Ferman receives its West End première at the Saville Theatre, starring Diane Cilento in the title role.

Musical films
Let's Be Happy, starring Vera-Ellen
The Tommy Steele Story
These Dangerous Years, starring Frankie Vaughan

Births
20 January – Andy Sheppard, saxophonist and composer
27 January – Janick Gers, guitarist and songwriter 
3 February – Steven Stapleton, singer-songwriter (Nurse with Wound and Current 93)
13 February – Tony Butler English bass player (Big Country and On the Air)
28 February – Phil Gould, drummer, singer and songwriter (Level 42)
21 March – John Whitfield, conductor
26 March – Paul Morley, music journalist
20 May – Sid Vicious, punk musician (died 1979)
27 May – Siouxsie Sioux, singer
29 May – Big George, composer, bandleader, and broadcaster (died 2011)
7 June – Paddy McAloon, English singer-songwriter (Prefab Sprout)
21 June – Mark Brzezicki, drummer (Big Country, The Cult, Ultravox, and Procol Harum)
24 June – Astro, rapper (UB40)
3 July – Poly Styrene, punk musician (died 2011)
11 July – Peter Murphy, singer-songwriter (Bauhaus and Dalis Car)
18 July – Keith Levene, English guitarist, songwriter, and producer (Public Image Ltd, The Flowers of Romance, and The Clash) (died 2022)
31 August – Glenn Tilbrook, singer, songwriter and guitarist (Squeeze)
11 September – Jon Moss, drummer
11 November – Tony 'Gad' Robinson, singer (Aswad)
20 December – Billy Bragg, singer-songwriter

Deaths
5 January – Gertie Gitana, music hall entertainer, 69
21 January – Harry Gordon, entertainer, 63
13 March – Lena Ashwell, entertainer, 84
12 May – Marie Rappold, operatic soprano, 83
1 August – Cathal O'Byrne, singer and poet, 90
18 August – Louis Levy, film composer, 62
1 September – Dennis Brain, horn virtuoso, 36 (car accident)
20 October – Jack Buchanan, singer, dancer, actor and director, 66
21 December – Eric Coates, composer, 71
date unknown 
William Henley, violinist, composer and arranger
Jack Robson, songwriter

See also 
 1957 in British television
 1957 in the United Kingdom
 List of British films of 1957

References 

 
British Music, 1957 In
British music by year